In functional analysis, the Dixmier-Ng Theorem is a characterization of when a normed space is in fact a dual Banach space.

 Dixmier-Ng Theorem. Let  be a normed space. The following are equivalent:

That 2. implies 1. is an application of the Banach–Alaoglu theorem, setting  to the Weak-* topology. That 1. implies 2. is an application of the Bipolar theorem.

Applications
Let  be a pointed metric space with distinguished point denoted .

References

Theorems in functional analysis